Duck tape may refer to:
 An alternative and the original term for duct tape
 Cotton duck, a similar cloth
 A specific brand of tape produced by ShurTech Brands